Harry James Lewis (born 9 January 2004) is an English professional footballer who plays as a midfielder for Gainsborough Trinity on loan from  club Scunthorpe United.

Playing career
Born in Scunthorpe, Lewis joined Scunthorpe United at under-13 level from Appleby-Frodingham. He made his debut in the English Football League on 1 January 2022, coming on as a 63rd-minute substitute for Ryan Loft in a 1–0 defeat to Carlisle United at Glanford Park. He signed a two-year professional contract (with the club retaining the option of a further 12-months) with the "Iron" in January 2022, which was due to begin six months later.

On 7 October 2022, Lewis joined Northern Premier League Premier Division club Gainsborough Trinity on an initial one month loan deal. Lewis returned to Scunthorpe on 7 December, joining National League North club Boston United for a month the following day. Upon the expiration of this loan, he returned to Gainsborough Trinity for a further month.

Statistics

References

2004 births
Living people
Sportspeople from Scunthorpe
English footballers
Association football midfielders
Scunthorpe United F.C. players
Gainsborough Trinity F.C. players
Boston United F.C. players
English Football League players
Northern Premier League players
National League (English football) players